Kashkuiyeh is a city in Kerman Province, Iran.

Kashkuiyeh may refer to:
 Kashkuiyeh, Hormozgan
 Kashkuiyeh, Bandar Abbas, Hormozgan Province
 Kashkuiyeh, Baft, Kerman Province
 Kashkuiyeh, Jiroft, Kerman Province
 Kashkuiyeh, alternate name of Kushkuiyeh, Kerman, Jiroft County, Kerman Province
 Kashkuiyeh, Sirjan, Kerman Province

See also
 Kushkuiyeh (disambiguation)